Langes Corners is an unincorporated community located in the Town of New Denmark, Brown County, Wisconsin, United States. The community was named for members of the Lange family, who founded the community in the 1890s. Frank Sindzinski became the first postmaster when the post office opened in May 1900.

References

Unincorporated communities in Brown County, Wisconsin
Unincorporated communities in Wisconsin
Green Bay metropolitan area